The orphanages run by Janusz Korczak and Stefania Wilczyńska were among the earliest democratic education institutes in the world. They were two orphanages, located in Warsaw. One orphanage was established for Jewish children in 1911 and stopped working on 1942, when the SS took all its residents and workers to Treblinka extermination camp. The other orphanage, for Christian children, was established in 1918, after World War I, and was nationalized by the German occupier in 1940. Most of the information about the educational method of those institutes was gathered in the Jewish orphanage.

References

External links
 Stefania Wilczyńska @ Find a Grave
 Korczak's Orphans opera by Adam Silverman and Susan Gubernat
 I'm small, but important, German Documentary by Walther Petri and Konrad Weiss
 Lewowicki, Tadeusz: Janusz Korczak. (PDF-File, 43 KB)  Prospects:the quarterly review of comparative education, vol. XXIV, no. 1/2, 1994, p. 37–48.
 Wiersz Kazimierza Dąbrowskiego "Wątek X - Janusz Korczak" Heksis 1/2010

Child-related organisations in Poland
Education in Warsaw
The Holocaust in Poland
Orphanages
Jewish orphanages